Miljanić is a South Slavic surname.

Notable people with the name include:

 Ana Miljanić (born 1982), Serbian athlete and politician
 Dijana Miljanić (born 1997), Montenegrin football player
 Miljan Miljanić (1930–2012), Yugoslav and Serbian football player, coach and administrator
 Milomir Miljanić (born 1963), Montenegrin folk singer
 Miloš Miljanić (born 1960), Serbian football manager and player
 Niko Miljanić (1892–1957), Montenegrin and Serbian anatomist and surgeon
 Radmila Miljanić (born 1988), Montenegrin handball player

See also
 Miljan

Serbian surnames
Montenegrin surnames